Virga Jesse (The branch from Jesse), WAB 52, is a motet by the Austrian composer Anton Bruckner. It sets the gradual Virga Jesse floruit for unaccompanied mixed choir.

History 

The work was completed on 3 September 1885 and may have been intended for the celebration of the one-hundredth anniversary of the Linz diocese; however, like the Ecce sacerdos magnus that Bruckner composed A.M.D.G. for that event, it was not performed there. It was performed on 8 December 1885 in the Wiener Hofmusikkapelle for the Feast of the Immaculate Conception.

The original manuscript is archived at the Österreichische Nationalbibliothek, and transcriptions of it at the Hofmusikkapelle and the Abbey of Kremsmünster. The motet was edited together with three other graduals (Locus iste WAB 23, Christus factus est WAB 11, and  WAB 30), by Theodor Rättig, Vienna in 1886.

Setting 
This 91-bar gradual in E minor is for mixed choir a cappella. The last part (bars 63-91) consists, as in the earlier Inveni David WAB 19, of an Alleluja, for which Bruckner drew his inspiration from the Hallelujah of Händel's Messiah, on which he often improvised on organ. The motet ends in pianissimo by the tenor voice on a pedal point.

Max Auer regards it as the most accomplished and magnificent a cappella motet of the composer. The Bruckner biographer Howie also calls this work "one of Bruckner's finest motets".

Selected discography 
The first recording of Bruckner's Vexilla regis occurred in 1931:
 Ferdinand Habel with the Choir of the St. Stephans-Dom, Vienna (78 rpm: Christschall 129)

A selection among the about 80 recordings:
 John Alldis, John Alldis Choir, Bruckner, Messiaen, Debussy, Schönberg – LP: Argo ZRG 523, 1967
 Norbert Balatsch, Wiener Staatsopernchor, 50 Jahre Konzertvereinigung Wiener Staatsopernchor – LP: Preiser SPR3278, 1976
 Matthew Best, Corydon Singers, Bruckner: Motets – CD: Hyperion CDA66062, 1982
 Frieder Bernius, Kammerchor Stuttgart, Bruckner: Mass in E minor; Ave Maria; Christus factus est; Locus iste; Virga Jesse – CD: Sony CL SK 48037, 1991
 Joseph Pancik, Prager Kammerchor, Anton Bruckner: Motetten / Choral-Messe – CD: Orfeo C 327 951 A, 1993
 Uwe Gronostay, Netherlands Chamber Choir, Bruckner/Reger – CD: Globe GLO 5160, 1995
 Peter Dijkstra, Chor des Bayerischen Rundfunks, Machet die Tore weit – CD: Oehms Classics OC 535, 2005
 Marcus Creed, SWR Symphony Orchestra and Stuttgart-Radio Vocal Ensemble, Mass in E minor and Motets – CD: Hänssler Classic SACD 93.199, 2007
 Stephen Layton, Polyphony Choir, Bruckner: Mass in E minor & Motets – CD: Hyperion CDA 67629, 2007
 Erwin Ortner, Arnold Schoenberg Chor, Anton Bruckner: Tantum ergo – CD: ASC Edition 3, issue of the choir, 2008
 Philipp Ahmann, MDR Rundfunkchor Leipzig, Anton Bruckner & Michael Haydn - Motets – SACD: Pentatone PTC 5186 868, 2021

References

Sources 
 Max Auer, Anton Bruckner als Kirchenmusiker, G. Bosse, Regensburg, 1927
 Anton Bruckner – Sämtliche Werke, Band XXI: Kleine Kirchenmusikwerke, Musikwissenschaftlicher Verlag der Internationalen Bruckner-Gesellschaft, Hans Bauernfeind and Leopold Nowak (Editor), Vienna, 1984/2001
 Cornelis van Zwol, Anton Bruckner 1824–1896 – Leven en werken, uitg. Thoth, Bussum, Netherlands, 2012. 
 Uwe Harten, Anton Bruckner. Ein Handbuch. , Salzburg, 1996.

External links 
 
 
Motet Translations / Anton Bruckner: "Virga Jesse", Emmanuel Music
Virga Jesse e-Moll, WAB 52 Critical discography by Hans Roelofs 
 A live performance by the UniversitätsChor München (2013) can be heard on YouTube: Virga Jesse

1885 compositions
Motets by Anton Bruckner
Advent music